Mourner is the common name used for several Neotropical birds from families Tityridae and Tyrannidae.

Species
 Tityridae:
 genus Schiffornis.
 Varzea mourner (Schiffornis major); alternatively greater schiffornis.
 Thrush-like mourner (Schiffornis turdina); alternatively thrush-like schiffornis.
 Greenish mourner (Schiffornis virescens); alternatively greenish schiffornis.
 genus Laniocera.
 Speckled mourner (Laniocera rufescens).
 Cinereous mourner (Laniocera hypopyrra).
 genus Laniisoma.
 Elegant mourner (Laniisoma elegans); alternatively shrike-like cotinga/laniisoma.
 Brazilian laniisoma (Laniisoma (elegans) elegans).
 Andean laniisoma (Laniisoma (elegans) buckleyi).
 Tyrannidae:
 genus Rhytipterna.
 Pale-bellied mourner (Rhytipterna immunda).
 Greyish mourner (Rhytipterna simplex).
 Rufous mourner (Rhytipterna holerythra).

Birds by common name